Ketsada Souksavanh (born 23 November 1992) is a Laotian football player. He is a member of Laos national football team.

Transfers

The Laotian transferred to Master 7 FC in 2022 Lao League 1

International

International goals 
Scores and results list Laos's goal tally first.

References 

http://th.soccerway.com/players/ketsada-souksavanh/158424/

1992 births
Living people
Laotian footballers
Laos international footballers
Lao Army F.C. players
Lao Toyota F.C. players
Laotian expatriate footballers
Laotian expatriate sportspeople in Thailand
Expatriate footballers in Thailand
Association football defenders
Footballers at the 2014 Asian Games
Asian Games competitors for Laos